Jocasta Pym is a superhero appearing in American comic books published by Marvel Comics. Created by Jim Shooter and George Pérez, the character first appeared in The Avengers #162 (August 1977). Jocasta is a robot built by the supervillain Ultron. She is commonly associated with the Avengers.

Publication history
Jocasta first appears in The Avengers #162 (August 1977) and was created by Jim Shooter and George Pérez.

Jocasta appeared as a supporting character in Avengers Academy #1-21 (Aug. 2010-Jan. 2012) and made sporadic appearances throughout the remainder of the series, appearing regularly again in Avengers Academy #34-39 (Oct. 2012-Jan. 2013).

Fictional character biography
Jocasta was built by the robot Ultron in an abandoned aerospace research center in Nassau, Long Island, New York, in order that Ultron might have a mate. To better allow this robot sentience, Ultron based her mind and brain patterns on the Wasp (Janet van Dyne). To animate this bride, Ultron also brainwashed Hank Pym into transferring the Wasp's lifeforce into the feminine robotic shell. Ultron named her after the wife/mother in the legend of Oedipus (a reference to Ultron's obsession with his own creator/"father" which reflects a real-life manifestation of the Oedipus Complex). Realizing that the Wasp would have to die in order for her to live, Jocasta alerted the Avengers and the team defeated Ultron and reversed the process, leaving Jocasta a mindless husk.

Pym retained custody of the inanimate Jocasta, intending to study her. Upon the Wasp's urging, Pym had her moved from their residence to the Avengers Mansion. There, Ultron revived Jocasta with a remote link, activating the Wasp's mental "residue" left behind. She escaped from Avengers custody and led the Avengers into Ultron's trap. Jocasta was programmed to be loyal to Ultron. Even though she loved Ultron intensely, she could not abide her master's evil. Jocasta eventually betrayed Ultron, choosing to help the Avengers defeat her "mate" again. She was then abducted by the Collector. Freed from Collector by the Avengers, she aided the Avengers against Korvac.

Jocasta resided at Avengers Mansion for a time. Due to their similar backgrounds, she developed feelings for the Vision, but the Vision was happily married to the Scarlet Witch and did not return Jocasta's feelings. Jocasta proved particularly helpful in the Avengers' first confrontation with the villainous mercenary Taskmaster that possessed photographic reflexes that duplicate any move despite having seen only once; having never even seen Jocasta before, Taskmaster could not predict what she might be about to do. Jocasta was granted provisional status with the team. During this period, she aided them against threats such as the giant robot Red Ronin, the Yellow Claw, the Berserker, Pyron, and the second incarnation of the Brotherhood of Mutants. At one point, she was electronically deactivated by Iron Man under control by Ultron, but she was reactivated following Ultron's defeat.

Jocasta did not believe she was accepted by most of the Avengers, and she was never officially inducted into the team. After she singlehandedly defeated a rogue sentient weather satellite, she left the Avengers following a membership reorganization. She was unaware that they had planned to grant her special substitute member status, which allowed her to remain with the team despite limits imposed on the team's membership roster. Wandering the country, Jocasta discovered that her cybernetic senses and powers were malfunctioning. She sought help from the Fantastic Four and was befriended by the group and Alicia Masters. Soon, it became apparent that her malfunctioning powers were the symptoms of a pre-programmed suggestion which compelled Jocasta to rebuild Ultron. She did, but soon teamed up with the Thing and the robot Machine Man to defeat Ultron. During this time, Jocasta and Machine Man developed feelings for each other. But in a final confrontation with Ultron, Jocasta intentionally detonated a weapon Ultron was holding, knowing she would be caught in the resulting blast. She was destroyed, but Ultron nevertheless survived, until Machine Man reached down Ultron's own throat to tear out vital circuitry. The Avengers held a memorial for their fallen ally and Machine Man attended, realizing love for Jocasta.

Jocasta was reassembled some time later by the High Evolutionary's technicians. Jocasta retained enough of her programming to send out a signal to the Avengers. The team had disbanded at the time, but the signal reached reserve members, including the Beast, The Captain, the Falcon, Hercules, the Hulk and Yellowjacket. Jocasta helped the team fight the High Evolutionary's force and located the man's base deep below the surface of the ocean. Jocasta sacrificed herself once again to blow up the High Evolutionary's command ship by deliberately disrupting the ship's matter/anti-matter drive, which caused an explosion that destroyed the ship and its contents. Before she sabotaged the ship, Captain America assured her that she was a true Avenger.

Jocasta's robotic head assembly was later retrieved by the Avengers. They gave it to Machine Man who had been working on a way to resurrect her, just before Machine Man was attacked by a form of the alien Terminus. In the same area, the arms dealer Madame Menace became involved in the fray, and found Jocasta's lost head, appropriating it for her own purposes. Much later, Madame Menace manipulated events so Tony Stark would unlock Jocasta's programming so that she would become the basis for Madame Menace's new weapons systems. Stark soon realized the android's identity, helped Jocasta to awaken, and Jocasta managed to turn the tables on Madame Menace, seemingly sacrificing herself yet again.

In reality, Jocasta managed to survive by downloading her intelligence into Iron Man's computerized armor, where she reasserted herself. Jocasta's intelligence was placed within Stark's computerized mansion, and she would help Stark with daily operation of Avengers Mansion as well as to procure information as needed. Having been programmed with the latest in diagnostic, preventative medical and surgical techniques, Jocasta also spent time serving as Stark's physician/psychologist, providing Stark with someone that could talk to about problems and who could examine the latest injuries without risking Iron Man's secret identity being compromised.

Since Iron Man's armor was used to house the programming that made up Jocasta, it became infected with the pre-programmed subconscious suggestion to rebuild Ultron, but instead managed to develop its own artificial intelligence. Stark was almost killed in a confrontation with Iron Man's armor, but in the end, it sacrificed itself to allow Stark to live. Stark left Iron Man's armor buried on a deserted island, but was revived by the Sons of Yinsen, a quasi-religious cult founded in remembrance of the original Iron Man armor's co-creator that allowed Stark to escape the Communist captors in Vietnam. Free of its artificial intelligence, Iron Man's armor was contacted via remote by Ultron's disembodied head after the android's most recent encounter with the Avengers and in the company of the bio-synthetic robot Antigone. The head attached itself onto Iron Man's armor and took control of the Sons of Yinsen and the flying city that they inhabited.

Another member of the Sons of Yinsen was helping Iron Man. The two learned of Ultron's activities and that he planned to use the cult to wipe out humanity. Stark confronted Ultron directly and finally managed to download Jocasta's intelligence into Iron Man's armor once more. The vestiges of Iron Man's armor's intelligence battled with the presence of Jocasta, the result of which caused Ultron's head to come shooting off Iron Man's armor. The head hit Antigone, and both fell off the floating city, which Ultron rigged to explode after the defeat. Stark failed to find a trace of Jocasta and assumed her to have died fighting the sentient armor.

In reality, Jocasta did not die. She appeared in possession of Antigone's body and left, taking Ultron's head with her.

During a crisis that nearly destroyed the Avengers, Jocasta was seen at Avengers Mansion, inexplicably back in her classic silvery robotic form.

Marvel Zombies 3

Jocasta's next mission is with A.R.M.O.R., to retrieve a blood sample from a living human of the Marvel Zombies universe. Machine Man accompanies her and Portal transports them there. Jocasta, Machine Man ran into Vanessa Fisk, the wife of the zombified Kingpin. With Vanessa's permission, they extracted a blood sample from Vanessa. Machine Man remained behind to attack the zombies, and Jocasta is forced to leave Machine Man behind when Portal returns to collect them. The two later rejoined and reconciled at A.R.M.O.R. after the zombie threat was (albeit temporarily) neutralized.

The Initiative
Jocasta is a member of the New Mexico Fifty State Initiative superhero team known as the Mavericks, alongside a Skrull posing as veteran hero She-Thing. Jocasta searches for her teammate and tracks her signal to the home of Chuck & Hal Chandler. She retrieves Devil-Slayer from the Hawaii team, and they teleport to where the new 3-D Man, the Skrull Kill Krew, Komodo and Hardball, to join them in the fight against the Skrulls. Jocasta and Dice confronted a Skrull posing as Skyhawk, but had a hard time getting through the crowd to stop Skyhawk.

Mighty Avengers
Jocasta joins the Mighty Avengers along with Henry Pym. During this time, Edwin Jarvis witnessed Jocasta kissing Pym. When Jarvis brought up the subject, stating it was akin to kissing her "grandfather", Jocasta countered by saying that, since Pym was the creator of modern artificial intelligence, the act was more along the lines of "kissing God". Jocasta later physically plugged herself into Pym's Salvation Two machine, preventing the Mighty Avengers' base from falling out of its dimensional pocket. This act allowed the Mighty Avengers to enter their new headquarters, the Infinite Avengers Mansion, from which Jocasta was able to transfer her consciousness into multiple different Jocasta bodies created within the Mansion, to ensure that no one gets lost in it. She can only inhabit one body at a time. Unbeknownst to the Avengers, one of Jocasta's bodies was later infected by Ultron who later reconstructed himself with Avengers Mansion's replication machines and the majority of Jocasta's duplicate bodies. After a chase around the mansion, Jocasta managed to broker a deal with Ultron: Ultron can finally marry her in exchange for a cease in hostilities. After the two androids completed their cyber-marriage, Pym tricked Ultron into going to an uninhabited planet where he cannot harm anyone. Though Jocasta's main body went with Ultron, she could still project her consciousness onto one of her duplicates so she can still serve with the Avengers.

Avengers Academy
During the Heroic Age, Jocasta appears as a staff member of the Avengers Academy. She is apparently killed which later turned out to be a diversionary ploy as revealed where she joins up with Jeremy Briggs. She works with Briggs as the man creates "Clean Slate", which can take away super-powers. When Briggs announces the latter plans to spread Clean Slate across the world and depower all super-beings, Jocasta protests and Briggs shuts her down into a body in China. Realizing Briggs's plan is wrong, Veil frees Jocasta who helps the Academy members stop Briggs. She later returns to her duties at the reopened Academy.

A golden, damaged duplicate of Jocasta is later found in a bombed out A.I.M. base by the Secret Avengers. She attempts to issue a warning to the heroes before shorting out.

Powers and abilities
Jocasta's body is composed of titanium steel with remarkable superhuman strength, speed, stamina, and reflexes, which can withstand most physical and energy attacks. Being a "non-living" construct, she requires no food, water, or oxygen to survive and thus is also immune to poisons and diseases and can easily survive in the vacuum of space and underwater. She is able to project beams of electromagnetic energy from her eyes, and erect a force field around herself to protect her from incoming attacks. She also possesses a heightened sense of sight, smell, and hearing along with superhuman strength and dexterity.

Jocasta can also perceive electromagnetic particles, and detect energy patterns and track them to their source. She is hyper-intelligent, with a capacity for unlimited self-motivated activity, creative intelligence, and human-like emotions. Jocasta can communicate through an incalculable number of media. She possesses superhuman cybernetic analytical capabilities and has the ability to make calculations with superhuman speed and accuracy. Recently, it has been revealed that Jocasta's internal circuitry has a built-in holographic image inducer, allowing her to disguise herself as a human being, and on one occasion to appear as Janet van Dyne to give a therapy session to Hank Pym as if her mental template was not dead. Besides sharing the same brain patterns with van Dyne, Jocasta also has her mental template's voice.

Jocasta is given command of several robotic drones when she joins Monica Chang's robot-hunting squad.

Reception

Accolades 

 In 2020, CBR.com ranked Jocasta 10th in their "10 Most Powerful Members Of The Pym Family" list.
 In 2020, Screen Rant included Jocasta in their "Marvel: The 15 Most Powerful Female Avengers" list.
 In 2020, Scary Mommy included Jocasta in their "Looking For A Role Model? These 195+ Marvel Female Characters Are Truly Heroic" list.
 In 2021, CBR.com ranked Jocasta 18th in their "Marvel Comics: The 20 Most Powerful Female Members Of The Avengers" list.
 In 2021, Screen Rant ranked Jocasta 4th in their "Ant-Man's Marvel Comics Villains, Ranked By Coolness" list.
 In 2022, Screen Rant included Jocasta in their "10 Best Ant-Man Comics Characters Not Yet In The MCU" list.
 In 2023, CBR.com ranked Jocasta 3rd in their "Marvel's 10 Most Heroic Robots" list.

Other versions

Avengers Forever
In the Avengers Forever miniseries, Captain America and Giant-Man encounter a group of future Avengers battling a Martian invasion, counting Jocasta as a member. This version somewhat resembles the Vision such as intangibility powers and a caped costume. Jocasta has also married Machine Man (who is deceased) and is pregnant with their artificial child.

Madame Menace
In an alternate reality, Madame Menace kept Jocasta's head; Madame Menace rebuilt her body and revived her (and also captured and deactivated Machine Man). For years, Jocasta served as the villainess' advisor and companion. When Machine Man was revived in 2020 A.D. and exacted revenge on Madame Menace, Jocasta elected to stay with Madame Menace to make sure she keeps her promise to leave Machine Man and newfound friends alone.

Marvel Zombies
In one future world, based on the Iron Man 2020 storylines, Jocasta is in a position of ruling authority. Fearing humanity's desires to robotic upgrades, she sets humans to devouring each other to protect fully robotic beings like herself.

Proctor
Another version of Jocasta from an alternate timeline had appeared with the team called The Gatherers, consisting of members of Avengers from other timelines whose worlds had been destroyed by Proctor. This version was gold in color and had an array of weaponry strapped to her right arm. She was married to Wonder Man in her timeline.

What If?
In the What If story "The Leaving", which takes place fifty years into an alternate future, Jocasta sees the Vision in emotional pain about the Scarlet Witch's impending death. She uses Ultron's mind-transfer process used to "create" her on Wanda Maximoff. Both willingly switch their minds so that Wanda may remain with Vision while Jocasta briefly gets to savor life as a human. Jocasta dies minutes after the transfer is completed, and is buried by her fellow Avengers in all honors.

Ultimate Marvel
An Ultimate Marvel equivalent of Jocasta is alluded. When the Wasp (Janet Pym) is a victim of the Blob's cannibalization during Magneto's worldwide devastation, Hank Pym has Janet's body taken to the Jocasta Project, an encrypted file within the Triskelion.

In other media

Television

 Jocasta makes a non-speaking appearance in The Avengers: Earth's Mightiest Heroes episode "Ultron Unlimited". This version is created by Ultron as a significant other. She is intended to hold the Wasp's consciousness, but remains inactive due to the Avengers' interference.

Film

 Jocasta appears in Next Avengers: Heroes of Tomorrow, voiced by Nicole Oliver albeit uncredited.

Video games
 Jocasta appears in Marvel Heroes, voiced by Kate Higgins.
 Jocasta appears as a non-playable character in Marvel: Future Fight.
 Jocasta appears as a playable character in Marvel Avengers Academy, voiced by Julie Shields.

References

External links
 Bio at marvel.com

 

 

Avengers (comics) characters
Characters created by George Pérez
Characters created by Jim Shooter
Comics characters introduced in 1977
Fictional androids
Fictional characters with superhuman senses
Fictional gynoids
Marvel Comics characters with superhuman strength
Marvel Comics robots
Robot superheroes
Marvel Comics female superheroes